Ida Hansson (born 27 July 1957) is a Swedish former freestyle swimmer. She competed in two events at the 1976 Summer Olympics.

References

External links
 

1957 births
Living people
Swedish female freestyle swimmers
Olympic swimmers of Sweden
Swimmers at the 1976 Summer Olympics
Swimmers from Gothenburg
20th-century Swedish women
21st-century Swedish women